Shut up is a phrase meaning "be quiet".

Shut Up may also refer to:

Shut Up (LaFee album), 2008
Shut Up (Kelly Osbourne album), 2002
"Shut Up" (The Black Eyed Peas song), 2003
"Shut Up" (LaFee song), 2008
"Shut Up" (Madness song), 1981
"Shut Up" (Kelly Osbourne song), 2002
"Shut Up" (R. Kelly song), 2011
"Shut Up!" (Simple Plan song), 2005
"Shut Up" (Stormzy song), 2015
"Shut Up" (Trick Daddy song), 1999
"Shut Up" (Unnies song), 2016
"Shut Up", a song by Christina Aguilera from Lotus, 2012
"Shut Up", a song by Blink-182 from Take Off Your Pants & Jacket, 2001
"Shut Up", a song by The Bloodhound Gang from One Fierce Beer Coaster, 1996
"Shut Up", a song by Ariana Grande from Positions, 2020
"Shut Up", a song by Nick Lachey from SoulO, 2003
"Shut Up", a song by Lush
"Shut Up", a song by The Stranglers, b-side to Nice 'n' Sleazy, 1978
"Shut Up", a song by Vixen from Tangerine, 1998
"Shut Up", a song by Joe Walsh from Songs for a Dying Planet, 1992
"Shut Up (and Sleep with Me)", a 1995 song by Sin with Sebastian
"Shut Up!!" (시끄러!!), a song by U-KISS from the EP Break Time, 2010
"Shut Up – The Footy's on the Radio", a 1987 song by TISM

See also
¿Por qué no te callas?, a phrase uttered by King Juan Carlos I of Spain (translated as "Why don't you shut up?")
Ruby & Quentin or Tais-toi! (literally "shut up!" in French), a 2003 film
Shut Your Mouth (disambiguation)
"Shut It", a 1996 song by The Damned
Shut the fuck up (disambiguation)
Shut Up and Dance (disambiguation)
STFU (disambiguation)